Patricia Moody (born 13 November 1934) is a British sprint canoer who competed in the late 1950s. She finished seventh in the K-1 500 m event at the 1956 Summer Olympics in Melbourne.

References

1934 births
Canoeists at the 1956 Summer Olympics
Living people
Olympic canoeists of Great Britain
British female canoeists